This is a list of bands and musicians from the Isle of Wight.

Notable bands from the Isle of Wight 

Level 42
The Bees (a.k.a. A Band of Bees)
Get Shakes
Champs
The Operators
Grade 2
The Waltons
Wet Leg
Luna Carina
Coach Party
5 Degrees North (5°N)

Notable Isle of Wight musicians 
Mark King, Level 42, Re-Flex
Jet Harris, former member of The Shadows, died 2011
Antony Harding, drummer of Hefner
Andy Booth, drummer of Go:Audio
Jon Thorne, session bassist, played for Lamb (band), Jools Holland, Robert Miles, Love Amongst Ruin and Robert Fripp
Stu Fisher, studio engineer and session drummer, performed with Hole (band), Ozric Tentacles and Courtney Love
Sarah Close, singer-songwriter and YouTuber
Dick Taylor, guitarist for Pretty Things and early bassist for The Rolling Stones
Lee Downer, singer and guitarist for The Defiled and LOWLIVES
Razzle (Nicholas Dingley) Drummer for Hanoi Rocks
Snowy White guitarist in Thin Lizzy 1980 to 1982
David Steele, Fine Young Cannibals

 
Bands